Caputa is an unincorporated community and census-designated place (CDP) in Pennington County, South Dakota, United States. The population was 32 at the 2020 census. Caputa has been assigned the ZIP code of 57725.

Caputa got its start in 1907 when the Milwaukee Railroad was extended to that point.

References

Unincorporated communities in Pennington County, South Dakota
Unincorporated communities in South Dakota
Rapid City, South Dakota metropolitan area